Good Movie may refer to:
 Good Movie (Greg Lawsell album) (2003)
 Good Movie (Pi'erre Bourne album) (2022)
 Good Movie, the titular single from Good Movie (Pi'erre Bourne album) (2022)